On 10 January 2015, nine people were killed and more than 30 wounded when two suicide bombers blew themselves up in a crowded café in Jabal Mohsen, Tripoli, Lebanon.

Events
After the first explosion, the second suicide bomber approached the Abu Imran café. Before he could blow himself up, 60-year-old father of seven "Abu Ali" Issa Khaddour rushed and tackled the bomber, and prevented many deaths. The wounded were taken to the hospital in Zgharta, as Jabal Mohsen residents were afraid that Sunni Islamist mobs would kill Alawite wounded if taken to a hospital in Tripoli. The dead were buried on January 12.

The al-Qaeda affiliated terrorist group Nusra Front took responsibility for the attacks, which targeted members of the Alawite sect. It was the first suicide attack on a civilian neighbourhood in nearly a year, following a security sweep that temporarily calmed the Bab al-Tabbaneh–Jabal Mohsen conflict between Sunnis and Alawites of Tripoli. Nusra claimed the attack was in revenge for the Syrian government's attacks on Sunnis in the Syrian civil war, and for a bombing of Sunni mosques that was blamed on Alawites. The interior minister of Lebanon, Nohad Machnouk, said on January 11 that the attack was carried out by the Islamic State of Iraq and the Levant.

Reaction
The US strongly condemned the attack. On January 11, the Qalamoun branch of the Nusra Front threatened to conduct more attacks against Jabal Mohsen and Hezbollah. On 10 April 2015, one of the men implicated in the bombings was killed by Lebanese security forces.

A suicide bombing was also supposed to have taken place in another Jabal Mohsen café simultaneously with the 2015 Beirut bombings on November 12, but the supposed bomber was detained.

References

2015 murders in Lebanon
21st century in Tripoli, Lebanon
21st-century mass murder in Lebanon
Attacks on buildings and structures in Lebanon
Attacks on restaurants in Asia 
Crime in Tripoli, Lebanon
ISIL terrorist incidents in Lebanon
January 2015 crimes in Asia
January 2015 events in Lebanon
Mass murder in 2015
Persecution of Alawites
Suicide bombings in 2015 
Suicide bombings in Lebanon
Terrorist incidents in Lebanon during the Syrian civil war
Terrorist incidents in Lebanon in 2015
Building bombings in Lebanon